Samuela Tupou (born 8 May 1956) is a Fijian former swimmer. He competed in four events at the 1984 Summer Olympics.

References

External links

1956 births
Living people
Fijian male swimmers
Olympic swimmers of Fiji
Swimmers at the 1984 Summer Olympics
Place of birth missing (living people)
20th-century Fijian people
21st-century Fijian people